Kaiser Point is located in the Lewis Range, Glacier National Park in the U.S. state of Montana. Maps indicate the peak is listed only by the elevation of  according to the Sea Level Datum of 1929, however the updated elevation by the currently implemented North American Vertical Datum of 1988 indicates the peak exceeds .

See also
 Mountains and mountain ranges of Glacier National Park (U.S.)

References

Kaiser Point
Mountains of Glacier County, Montana
Mountains of Glacier National Park (U.S.)
Lewis Range